Johnson Point is a point jutting into Jacobsen Bight dividing it into two bays, on the south coast of South Georgia. The point marks the southern end of one of the best sedimentary successions on the island. It was named by the UK Antarctic Place-Names Committee in 1982 after Clive E. Johnson, a British Antarctic Survey field assistant in the area in 1975–76, and at Rothera Station, 1977–79. Clive Johnson is now one of the most experienced polar explorers in the UK today and in 2001 was awarded the 'Polar Medal' by Her majesty Queen Elizabeth for his 'Outstanding contribution to and as a member of British polar expeditions.

See also
Johnson (disambiguation)

References

Headlands of South Georgia